Longyear is a surname. Notable people with the surname include:

Barry Longyear (born 1942), American science fiction author and screenwriter
Burton Orange Longyear (1868–1969), American botanist and forester
John Munroe Longyear (1850–1922), the founder of Longyearbyen
John W. Longyear (1820–1875), U.S. Representative from Michigan
Judith Q. Longyear (1938–1995), mathematician

See also
Longyearbyen, the largest settlement in Norway's Svalbard archipelago
Longyear River, a river on the island of Spitsbergen in Svalbard, Norway
Longyear Valley, a valley on the island of Spitsbergen in Svalbard, Norway